Sapli-Sépingo is a town in northeastern Ivory Coast. It is a sub-prefecture of Bondoukou Department in Gontougo Region, Zanzan District.

Sapli-Sépingo was a commune until March 2012, when it became one of 1126 communes nationwide that were abolished.

In 2014, the population of the sub-prefecture of Sapli-Sépingo was 8,204.

Villages
The six villages of the sub-prefecture of Sapli-Sépingo and their population in 2014 are:
 Bokoni (133)
 Dagboloyo (329)
 Djobri (390)
 Gbréda (668)
 Sapli-Séplingo (6 298)
 Savagne (386)

Notes

Sub-prefectures of Gontougo
Former communes of Ivory Coast